Juan Hernández Ramírez (born 8 March 1965) is a Mexican former professional footballer who plays as a defender. He obtained a total number of 36 caps for the Mexico national team between 1987 and 1993, and was a squad member at the 1993 Copa América.

He made his debut on March 17, 1987. In 2009, during the Club América 93rd anniversary, Hernández Ramírez was inducted into the players hall of fame for being considered a talented player throughout the 1980s and 1990s although his league titles were limited to 1987-1988 and the 1988-1989 championships.

References

1965 births
Living people
Mexico international footballers
Association football defenders
Club América footballers
C.F. Monterrey players
Club Necaxa footballers
Atlante F.C. footballers
Liga MX players
1991 CONCACAF Gold Cup players
1993 CONCACAF Gold Cup players
1993 Copa América players
CONCACAF Gold Cup-winning players
Footballers from Mexico City
Mexican footballers